The 1972 Wisconsin Badgers football team was an American football team that represented the University of Wisconsin–Madison in the 1972 Big Ten Conference football season. In their third year under head coach John Jardine, the Badgers compiled a 4–7 record (2–6 against conference opponents) and finished in ninth place in the Big Ten Conference.

Rufus Ferguson led the team with 1,004 rushing yards, was selected as the team's most valuable player, and was chosen by the Associated Press (AP) as a first-team running back, and by the United Press International (UPI) as a second-team running back, on the 1972 All-Big Ten Conference football team. Three other Wisconsin players received All-Big Ten honors: center Mike Webster (UPI-2); offensive guard Keith Nosbusch (AP-2, UPI-2); linebacker Dave Lokanc (AP-1, UPI-2).

Schedule

Roster

Players in the 1973 NFL Draft
The following Wisconsin players were selected in the 1973 NFL Draft.

References

Wisconsin
Wisconsin Badgers football seasons
Wisconsin Badgers football